The 1963 Oakland Raiders season was the team's fourth in Oakland. The campaign saw the team attempt to improve upon its abysmal 1962 record of 1–13.

In his first year with the organization, Raiders legend Al Davis, formerly a receivers coach with the San Diego Chargers, replaced the team's original gold and black uniforms with the current "silver and black" scheme. Under his leadership as head coach and general manager, the Raiders stunned the rest of the AFL by winning ten games. They finished with a record of 10–4, which was good for second place in the Western Division, one game behind the eventual AFL champion Chargers, whom they had defeated twice. The Raiders swept the Western division in 1963, winning all six games. For his role in the Raiders' miraculous turnaround, Al Davis was named the AFL's "Coach of the Year".

Season schedule

Roster

Game summaries

Week 1 at  Oilers

Week 2

Week 3

Week 4

Week 5

Week 6

Week 7

Week 8 

    
    
    
    
    
    
    
    
    
    
    

 Clem Daniels 19 Rush, 125 Yds

Week 9

Week 10 

    
    
    
    
    
    

 Clem Daniels 31 Rush, 122 Yds

Week 12

Week 13 

    
    
    
    
    
    
    
    
    
    
    

 Art Powell 6 Rec, 132 Yds

Week 14 

    
    
    
    
    
    
    
    
    
    

 Clem Daniels 5 Rec, 127 Yds

Week 15 

    
    
    
    
    
    
    
    
    
    
    
    
    
    
    

 Tom Flores 17/29, 407 Yds
 Clem Daniels 22 Rush, 158 Yds
 Art Powell 10 Rec, 247 Yds

Standings

References

External links 
 1963 Oakland Raiders at Pro-Football-Reference.com

Oakland
Oakland Raiders seasons
Oakland